This is a list of Brazilian films scheduled for release in 2015.

2015

January–March

April–June

July–September

October–December

Unknown release dates
 Éden by Bruno Safadi
 Entre Abelhas  by Ian SBF
 The Second Mother by Anna Muylaert
 Um Homem Só by Cláudia Jouvin

See also
2015 in Brazil
2015 in Brazilian television

References

2015
Films
Brazilian